Olgun Şimşek (born 1 June 1971) is a Turkish actor.

Biography
Olgun Şimşek was born in the village of Yenice in Büyükorhan, Bursa. His father was a primary school teacher and his mother was a housewife. He graduated in theatre from the Istanbul University State Conservatory and began acting professionally in 1993.

Şimşek acted in the play Otogargara with Demet Akbağ and Yılmaz Erdoğan. He had a small parts in the films Tersine Dünya in 1993 and Yer Çekimli Aşıklar in 1995. In 1998, he acted in the film Karışık Pizza for which he won the Most Promising Actor award at the Ankara Film Festival.

Şimşek  also had appearances in television series such as Sihirli Ceket, Yedi Numara, Beşik Kertmesi ve Alacakaranlık. In 2004, he starred in the film Yazı Tura directed by Uğur Yücel where he played a disabled soldier. For this, he won several awards including the Golden Orange for Best Actor as well as Best Actor awards at the Ankara Film Festival, Istanbul Film Festival, Adana Golden Coccoon Festival and the SİYAD awards. Currently, he is starring in a Turkish comedy show Yalan Dunya.

Filmography

 1993: Tersine Dünya - TV series
 1993: Tetikçi Kemal - TV series
 1994: Aziz Ahmet - TV series
 1994: Gülşen Abi - TV series
 1995: Yer Çekimli Aşklar - TV series
 1996: Sihirli Ceket - TV series
 1996: Sultanım - Erkan Yılbaş - TV series
 1997: Bir Demet Tiyatro - Kudret/Bahattin - TV program
 1998: Dış Kapının Mandalları - TV series
 1998: Karışık Pizza - Murat - TV series
 1998: Tatlı Rüyalar - Ali Haydar Akbayır - TV series
 2001: Yeşil Işık - Ferdi
 2002: Beşik Kertmesi - TV series
 2000–2003: Yedi Numara - Sabit Ballıoğlu - TV series
 2003: Alacakaranlık - Emir Büyükdereci - TV series
 2003: Yazı Tura - Rıdvan
 2005: Beyaz Gelincik - Aziz Kudret Tarhan - TV series
 2005: Kapıları Açmak - Cihan - TV series
 2008: Akşamdan Kalma - Hidayet
 2009–2010: Kapalıçarşı - Mahmut - TV series
 2010: Akşamdan Kalma 2 - Hidayet
 2012: Gözetleme Kulesi - Nihat - TV series
 2012: Yalan Dünya - Selahattin/Ahmet - TV series
 2012: Akşamdan Kalma 3 - Hidayet
 2017: Eşkıya Dünyaya Hükümdar Olmaz - Yaşar Kimsesiz - TV series
 2017: Bana Söyleme - Yılmaz Akbağ - TV series
 2020: Ramo - Cihangir Hanlı - TV series
 2022: Cici - Netflix original film

References

External links
 

1971 births
People from Bursa
Living people
Turkish male film actors
Turkish male stage actors
Turkish male television actors
Best Actor Golden Orange Award winners
Best Actor Golden Boll Award winners